Todorići  is a village in the municipality of Bileća, Bosnia and Herzegovina.

References

Populated places in Bosnia and Herzegovina